The 1955 Western Michigan Broncos team represented Western Michigan College in the 1955 NCAA baseball season. The Broncos played their home games at Hyames Field. The team was coached by Charlie Maher in his 17th season at Western Michigan.

The Broncos lost the College World Series, defeated by the Wake Forest in the championship game.

Roster

Schedule and results

Schedule Source:

Awards and honors 
Bill Lajoie
ABAC First Team All-American

References

Western Michigan Broncos baseball seasons
Western Michigan Broncos baseball
College World Series seasons
Western Michigan
Mid-American Conference baseball champion seasons